There have been several super cups organized in 1989. These include, and are not limited to:

 1989 Albanian Supercup, the Albanian soccer match, and first Albanian Supercup for association football
 1989 Bulgarian Supercup, the Bulgarian soccer match, and first Bulgarian Supercup for association football
 1989 DFB-Supercup, the West German soccer match, and third DFB Supercup for association football
 1989 European Super Cup, the UEFA soccer match, and 14th European Super Cup for association football
 1989 FIBA European Super Cup, the European basketball match, and 2nd European Super Cup for basketball
 1989 Israel Super Cup, the Israeli soccer match, and 18th Israel Super Cup for association football
 1989 ADAC Supercup, the West German sports car racing season organized by ADAC and officially called SAT 1 Supercup '89

See also
 Super Bowl XXIII, the 1989 U.S. professional American football match of the NFL